The 1948 United States presidential election in Washington took place on November 2, 1948, as part of the 1948 United States presidential election. Voters chose eight representatives, or electors, to the Electoral College, who voted for president and vice president.

Washington was won by incumbent President Harry S. Truman (D–Missouri), running with Kentucky Senator Alben W. Barkley, with 52.61 percent of the popular vote, against Governor Thomas Dewey (R–New York), running with California Governor Earl Warren, with 42.68 percent of the popular vote.

, this is the last occasion Lincoln County has voted for a Democratic Presidential candidate.

Results

Results by county

See also
 United States presidential elections in Washington (state)

References

Washington
1948
1948 Washington (state) elections